The American Legion Boys State and American Legion Auxiliary Girls State are summer leadership and citizenship programs for high school juniors, which focus on exploring the mechanics of American government and politics. The programs are sponsored by the American Legion (AL) and the American Legion Auxiliary (ALA) respectively. Boys and girls are usually nominated by their high school during their junior year. Boys and Girls State programs both began in 1937 and are held in each of the U.S. states (except Hawaii where there is only a Girls State program), usually at a college within that state. There is also a Boys State session held in Washington, D.C. In general, male and female programs are held separately, but at least nine states—Georgia, Nebraska, Oregon, California, Louisiana, Massachusetts, Pennsylvania, Rhode Island, and Missouri—host Boys and Girls State on the same campus on the same week.

Each state's program varies, but in general program participants are divided into subgroups referred to as cities or towns.  Most programs will assign citizens to one of two political parties. These parties are generally not representative of existing American parties. Delegates in many programs meet as parties and craft their own unique party platforms from scratch. Some parties carry their platforms over from year to year. Although most programs assign citizens randomly to a political party, a few programs have an ideological sorting mechanism to place delegates in a political party with others holding similar views. The citizens of each of these cities elect mock municipal officials, county officials, and representatives to the mock state legislature. Many programs also have a county level as well. The participants also elect state officials, such as governor, lieutenant governor, and other state-level officials mirroring their actual state. The legislature meets to organize, elect leaders, and to pass bills, in a way that is similar to how their actual state legislature operates. Some programs tend to have a more traditional education focus, providing speakers and training throughout the week and then concluding with mock political functions. Other programs take a more hands-on approach by running the mock government activities all week.

All programs generally follow a similar pattern, but vary by state. Some states (e.g. Nebraska ) hold mock trials with the participants volunteering as lawyers, accused, and juries. Some states include a journalism component that represents the Fourth Estate in the political process. North Dakota includes a classroom-based emergency management simulation that requires participants to respond to various large-scale disasters by managing communication, resources and personnel. Other programs include creative and fun activities such as band, choir,  talent shows, and athletic competition. Some of the programs (e.g., New Mexico) host a dance during the week, inviting high school girls/boys from the area to attend. The Oregon program has moved away from using any mock systems to a completely simulated "State of Christensen" with its own law and order system that grows yearly and is passed on to the consecutive year.

Boys/Girls State is typically staffed by Legion Family members, past participants, and/or community leaders who volunteer their time and effort. Administrative costs are defrayed by their state Legion organizations and local businesses.

Selection
Selection varies by state and by girls or boys state program.  Historically, in most states, only one or two students are sent to Boys/Girls State from each high school. Therefore, selection is highly competitive, and the population of students attending represents the top talent from across the state. 
Although recruitment procedures vary, Boys/Girls State participants are often selected with the help of high school principals or guidance counselors. Participants must be between their junior and senior years in high school to qualify.

Benefits
Because the hundreds of students at any given Boys/Girls State represent the top talent of that age year, being elected to a high office, such as governor, at the event can be an important distinguishing achievement for college or military academy admissions.

While each state's offerings differ, many programs offer college credit to those attending Boys/Girls State.  Additionally many colleges and universities offer scholarships and other awards to those attending a Boys/Girls State program.  Also, the Samsung American Legion Scholarship, which can only be applied for by Boys/Girls State attenders, is an endowed scholarship fund of $5 million administered by the American Legion. In 2010, ten $20,000 scholarships and 88 $1,000 scholarships were awarded to those who completed a Boys/Girls State program. Attendance at Boys State carries the same weight on a résumé as earning the distinction of Eagle Scout, especially when applying to US military schools and academies.

Events 
Once there, students typically engage in a number of political activities such as running for office, electing officials, drafting and debating bills, and making motions. Some programs offer city and county mock courts, and a state Supreme Court, with the participants acting as lawyers, judges, plaintiffs, defendants, and jury members. There are lectures and workshops for students to fully immerse themselves in government and politics. Parliamentary procedure (Robert's Rules of Order) is typically utilized.

A majority of programs divide their participants into two political parties: Nationalists and Federalists.  Each political party establishes an official party platform voted on by its members. Participants are elected to a variety of offices including House of Representatives and Senate seats, executive offices (governor, lieutenant governor, secretary of state, treasurer, etc.). Participants also run for city and county offices such as mayor, county clerk, municipal judge, city councilman, and many more depending on the individual program's setup.

Some programs, given their proximity to their state capital, make a field trip to visit and have a tour and meet their representatives, if they are present.

Many programs handle aspects of their individual programs differently from other states. For example, New York Boys' State involves exposure to regimented military experiences, such as early-morning physical training and marching instruction provided by members of the US Marines.

Program directors and counselors meet at the annual American Legion Americanism Conference held in Indianapolis, IN each fall. This offers programs a platform to exchange ideas and best practices. The American Legion Auxiliary has a parallel program held at the same time.

History
The creation of the Boys State program in 1935 is credited to Hayes Kennedy, an instructor at the Loyola University Chicago School of Law and Americanism Chairman of the Illinois Department of the American Legion; and Harold Card, the Department Boy Scout chairman and junior high school instructor. Kennedy and Card were concerned about the youth attending political indoctrination camps in the late 1930s.

Documentation provided by various Boys State programs across the country refer to these as "Young Pioneer Camps", and alternately describe them as either fascist- or communist-inspired. Since the Young Pioneer Camps was the name of a youth program based in the Soviet Union that made inroads in the U.S. in the early 20th century, it is likely that these left-wing movements are what Kennedy was responding to, and not the growth of the radical right. Kennedy felt that a counter movement must be started among the ranks of the nation's youth to stress the importance and value of a democratic form of government and maintain an effort to preserve and perpetuate it.

The Illinois Department of the American Legion approved Kennedy's and Card's project and in June 1935, the very first Boys State in the nation was held on the grounds of the Illinois State Fair.

As this program succeeded and spread throughout the United States, the American Legion Auxiliary (ALA) began providing similar opportunities for girls of high school age. Thus Girls State was founded. The first Girls State was conducted in 1937 and since 1948 has been a regular part of the ALA's better citizenship programs.

In 1981, Louisiana Boys State delegate Kirk Givens of Tioga High School in Pineville died when he fell or jumped out of his 12th floor Kirby-Smith dorm room window at Louisiana State University while sleepwalking.

A documentary film on the program, focused on 2018 Texas Boys State, premiered at the Sundance Film Festival in 2020. It was released on Apple TV+ on August 14, 2020. A "sibling" film about Girls State was planned to be shot during 2020 but has been delayed due to the COVID-19 pandemic.

Boys Nation and Girls Nation
Since 1947, each Boys State and Girls State program sends two delegates to Boys Nation and Girls Nation in Washington, D.C. Each state chooses their delegates differently. These delegates are sometimes the participants elected to the governor and lieutenant governor positions, but other states have separate elections for the honor, while still other states appoint their delegates through interviews with the Legionnaires who run each state program.

The event endeavors to teach delegates about the processes of federal government in the United States of America, through taking part in a mock Senate and mock elections of a Boys/Girls Nation Senate president pro tempore and secretary, vice president, and president, attending lectures, and visiting governmental institutions and historical sites.

Notable alumni
Notable alumni of the Boys and Girls State programs include:

 Roger Ailes
 Fred Akers
 Lamar Alexander
 Samuel Alito
 Theresa Amato
 Rob Andrews
 Neil Armstrong
 Reubin Askew
 Bruce Babbitt
 Rosalyn Baker
 Scott Bakula
 David Barlow
 Barry K. Barnes
 William G. Batchelder
 Max Baucus
 Skip Bayless
 Mike Beebe
 Dick Bennett
 Ken Bennett
 Robert J. Bentley
 Eric Berry
 Beau Biden
 Matt Blunt
 Jim Bohannon
 Jon Bon Jovi
 Cory Booker
 Katie Britt
 Tom Brokaw
 Garth Brooks
 Jon Bruning
 Steve Bullock
 John W. Carlin
 Julian Carroll
 James Carville
 Dick Cheney
 Lawton Chiles
 Aneesh Chopra
 Chris Christie
 Wesley Clark
 Bill Clinton
 Mike Coffman
 Tim Cook
 Richard Cordray
 Tom Cotton
 Mike Crapo
 Steve Daines
 Carroll Dale
 Mitch Daniels
 Tom Daschle
 Lawrence DiCara
 Lou Dobbs
 Steve Doocy
 Michael Dukakis
 Ericka Dunlap
 Dan Duquette
 Fred DuVal
 Roger Ebert
 Edwin Edwards
 John Ensign
 Michael Patrick Flanagan
 Robert Frederick Froehlke
 James Gandolfini
 Dan Gattis
 Charles D. Gemar
 Richard Gergel
 Michael L. Gernhardt
 Leeza Gibbons
 Paul Gillmor
 Alex Gorsky
 Randy Gradishar
 Chuck Grassley
 Jonathan Greenert
 Eric Greitens
 Robert Griffin III
 E. Lynn Harris
 Mike Hazen
 Dave Heineman
 Joel Heitkamp
 Terence T. Henricks
 Jess Herbst
 Hugh Hewitt
 John Hoeven
 Bob Holden
 Vonnie Holiday
 Ernest C. Hornsby
 Ken Howard
 Glenn Hubbard
 Mike Huckabee
 James Hunt
 Keith Jackson
 Phil Jackson
 Fishel Jacobs
 Donald M. James
 Fob James
 Al Jarreau
 Mike Johanns
 Joe Johns
 Gregory H. Johnson
 Gus Johnson 
 Michelle D. Johnson
 Russell Jones
 Michael Jordan
 Phil Keisling
 Alan Keyes
 Angus King
 David Koechner
 Stan Kroenke
 Ted Kulongoski
 Bob Kustra
 Brian Lamb
 Mary Landrieu
 Jonathan Larkin
 Greg Lashutka
 Mike Lee
 Loren Leman
 Roger P. Lempke
 Delano Lewis
 Joseph Lieberman
 Rush Limbaugh
 Donal Logue
 Trent Lott
 Richard Lugar
 Ray Mabus
 Greil Marcus
 James G. Martin
 Craig Melvin
 Scott McCallum
 Ryan McGee
 John R. McKernan Jr.
 M. Peter McPherson
 Bob Menéndez
 Gray H. Miller
 Henson Moore
 Tim Moore
 Thomas J. Moyer
 Chris Murphy
 Scott Murphy
 Ben Nelson
 Al Neuharth
 Michael J. Newman
 Sam Nunn
 William A. O'Neill
 Mike Oxley
 Ajit Pai
 George Pataki
 Jane Pauley
 John Perez
 Tom Petri
 Thomas G. Plaskett
 Larry Pressler
 David Pryor
 Andre Quintero
 Jim Ramstad
 Nancy Redd
 Harry Reid
 Ann Richards
 Joseph P. Riley Jr.
 Richard Riley
 Ron Rivera
 Buddy Roemer
 Patrick Rose
 Nick Saban
 James Santelle
 Ben Sasse
 Scott Scarborough
 Derek Schmidt
 Tim Scott
 Jonathan Shapiro
 James Shumway
 Brad Smith
 G. Murrell Smith Jr.
 Larry Smith
 Abigail Spencer
 Bruce Springsteen
 Katie Stam
 William A. Steiger
 Gene Stephenson
 Carole Keeton Strayhorn
 Josh Svaty
 John Thune
 Daniel J. Travanti
 Donald L. Tucker
 David Valesky
 Gaddi Vasquez
 David Vitter
 Gy Waldron
 Scott Walker
 Summer Walker
 Brad Walsh
 Jon Waters
 Ron Walters
 Carl E. Walz
 Hines Ward
 Jerry West
 T. K. Wetherell
 Lari White
 Wayne W. Williams
 Bob Wise
 Drew Wrigley
 Michael Yanney
 Kevin Patrick Yeary
 Ryan Zinke

See also
 Hugh O'Brian Youth Leadership Foundation
 Missouri Boys State
 Model United Nations
 MSC Student Conference on National Affairs at Texas A&M University
 YMCA Youth & Government

References

External links
National Boys State Directory
National Girls State Directory

American Legion
American nationalism
Educational organizations based in the United States
Organizations established in 1935